Lawrence Joseph Vilardo (born June 6, 1955) is a United States district judge of the United States District Court for the Western District of New York.

Biography

Vilardo was born on June 6, 1955, in Buffalo, New York. He graduated from Canisius High School where he formed lasting friendships and then received a Bachelor of Arts  summa cum laude, in 1977 from Canisius College. He received a Juris Doctor magna cum laude, in 1980 from Harvard Law School. He served as a law clerk to Judge Irving Loeb Goldberg of the United States Court of Appeals for the Fifth Circuit, from 1980 to 1981. From 1981 to 1986, he was an associate at the law firm of Damon Morey LLP. From 1986 to 2015, he was a founding partner of the law firm of Connors & Vilardo, LLP., where he conducted a wide range of civil and criminal litigation in State and Federal courts at the trial and appellate levels.

Federal judicial service

On February 4, 2015, President Barack Obama, on the recommendation of Senator Chuck Schumer, nominated Vilardo to serve as a United States District Judge of the United States District Court for the Western District of New York, to the seat vacated by Judge Richard Arcara, who assumed senior status on January 3, 2015. He received a hearing before the United States Senate Judiciary Committee on May 6, 2015. On June 4, 2015, his nomination was reported out of committee by a voice vote. On October 26, 2015, the United States Senate confirmed his nomination by a 88–0 vote. He received his judicial commission on October 29, 2015.

See also
List of Hispanic/Latino American jurists

References

External links

1955 births
Living people
Canisius College alumni
Harvard Law School alumni
Hispanic and Latino American judges
Judges of the United States District Court for the Western District of New York
New York (state) lawyers
Lawyers from Buffalo, New York
United States district court judges appointed by Barack Obama
21st-century American judges